Aleksander "Alek" Østreng (born 5 April 1991) is a Norwegian snowboarder. He grew up in Bærum.

He participated at the 2012 World Snowboarding Championships, where he placed 5th in slopestyle. He  competed at the Winter X Games XX in Aspen, Colorado, where he placed 5th in slopestyle.

References

External links 
 

1991 births
Living people
Sportspeople from Bærum
X Games athletes
Norwegian male snowboarders